NK Partizan may refer to:

NK Partizan Žalec – former name of NK Žalec
NK Partizan Slovenj Gradec

See also
FK Partizan (disambiguation)
FC Partizan (disambiguation)
TJ Partizán Domaniža
Partizán Bardejov